Susto is an album by Japanese jazz pianist, composer and band leader Masabumi Kikuchi. This album was recorded in the same session with another album, One-Way Traveller, at his home studio, Sound Ideas Studios, New York, United States in November, 1980 and additionally recorded and remixed at CBS/Sony Roppongi Studio, Tokyo, Japan in December 1980 and January, 1981. This album was released in 1981 by CBS/Sony.

Overview
Even his previous album, Wishes (East Wind, 1976) with Kochi ensemble  - which involved almost all of Miles Davis' Agharta & Pangaea band from 1975 plus he's got his frequent collaborator Terumasa Hino, the Japanese trumpeter who's uncannily kept the flame of Davis's music alive – Kikuchi refuses to use the word seance for this session. But there's no escaping the fact that it's been over five years since Miles disappeared. The promise and possibilities of his electric music seemed to vanish with him. Even the fusion by his proteges and cohorts is hopelessly bland, stale, saccharine. So this attempt to exhume and extend the music of the master is going against the tide. He's attempting to make music that steps outside of time. He incorporated ambient patches and swaths of traditional Japanese music. But this time he wants that sound. He wants the hard grooves, the soaring trumpet, the hiccuping electric guitars and percolating mesh of polyrhythms.

Reception
At Japrocksampler, author and musician Julian Cope writes about Susto that:

Track listing

Credits

 Masabumi Kikuchi – keyboards, Rhodes synthesizer (2 solo, 3 solo, 4 solo), producer
 James Mason – electric guitar
 Hassan Jenkins – bass 
 Richie Morales – drums
 Aïyb Dieng – percussion, congas (3, 4)
 Steve Grossman – soprano saxophone (1, 2, 4), tenor saxophone (3)
 Yahya Sediq – drums (1, 3, 4)
 Terumasa Hino – Bolivian flute (1), cornet (2, 4 solo)
 Dave Liebman – soprano saxophone (1, 4 solo), alto flute (2 solo), tenor saxophone (4)
 Sam Morrison – instruments (wind driver by), (1, 2, 3 solo)
 Airto Moreira – percussion (1, 2, 4)
 Marlon Graves – electric guitar (1, 3)
 Butch Campbell – electric guitar (2, 4)
 Billy Patterson – electric guitar (3, 4)
 Barry Finnerty – electric guitar (1)
 Alyrio Lima – percussion (1)
 Ed Walsh – Oberheim and synthesizer programming (1)

 Ryoko Ishioka – cover (design)
 Hisamitsu Noguchi – liner notes
 Kazumi Kurigami – photography by
 Kiyoshi Itoh – producer
 Jim McCurdy – recorded by
 Yochihiro Suzuki – recorded by (additional recording), mixed by

References

1981 albums
Masabumi Kikuchi albums